Gripopterygidae is a family of stoneflies in the order Plecoptera. There are more than 50 genera and 320 described species in Gripopterygidae.

Genera
These 57 genera belong to the family Gripopterygidae:

 Acroperla McLellan, 1977
 Alfonsoperla McLellan & Zwick, 2007
 Andiperla Aubert, 1956
 Andiperlodes Illies, 1963
 Antarctoperla Enderlein, 1905
 Apteryoperla Wisely, 1953
 Araucanioperla Illies, 1963
 Aubertoperla Illies, 1963
 Aucklandobius Enderlein, 1909
 Cardioperla McLellan, 1971
 Ceratoperla Illies, 1963
 Chilenoperla Illies, 1963
 Claudioperla Illies, 1963
 Dinotoperla Tillyard, 1921
 Dundundra Theischinger, 1982
 Ericiataperla Vera Sanchez, 2016
 Eunotoperla Tillyard, 1924
 Falklandoperla McLellan, 2001
 Gripopteryx Pictet, 1841
 Guaranyperla Froehlich, 2001
 Holcoperla McLellan, 1977
 Illiesoperla McLellan, 1971
 Kirrama Theischinger, 1981
 Leptoperla Newman, 1839
 Limnoperla Illies, 1963
 Megaleptoperla Tillyard, 1923
 Megandiperla Illies, 1960
 Neboissoperla McLellan, 1971
 Neopentura Illies, 1965
 Nescioperla Theischinger, 1982
 Nesoperla Tillyard, 1923
 Newmanoperla McLellan, 1971
 Notoperla Enderlein, 1909
 Notoperlopsis Illies, 1963
 Nydyse Navás, 1933
 Odontoperla Mynott, Suter & Theischinger, 2017
 Oedemaperla Mynott, Suter & Theischinger, 2017
 Paragripopteryx Enderlein, 1909
 Pehuenioperla Vera Sanchez, 2009
 Pelurgoperla Illies, 1963
 Plegoperla Illies, 1963
 Potamoperla Illies, 1963
 Rakiuraperla McLellan, 1977
 Rhithroperla Illies, 1963
 Riekoperla McLellan, 1971
 Rungaperla McLellan, 1977
 Senzilloides Illies, 1963
 Taraperla McLellan, 1998
 Teutoperla Illies, 1963
 Trinotoperla Tillyard, 1924
 Tupiperla Froehlich, 1969
 Uncicauda McLellan & Zwick, 2007
 Vesicaperla McLellan, 1967
 Zelandobius Tillyard, 1921
 Zelandoperla Tillyard, 1923

Extinct genera 

 † Cardioperlisca Sinitshenkova, 1992 Khaya Formation, Russia, Jurassic/Cretaceous boundary (Tithonian-Berriasian) Doronino Formation, Russia, Early Cretaceous (Barremian)
 † Eodinotoperla Jell & Duncan, 1986 Koonwarra fossil bed, Australia, Early Cretaceous (Aptian)

References

Further reading

External links

 

Plecoptera
Plecoptera families
Aquatic insects